Liu Tang is a fictional character in Water Margin, one of the Four Great Classical Novels in Chinese literature. Nicknamed "Red Haired Devil", he ranks 21st among the 36 Heavenly Spirits, the first third of the 108 Stars of Destiny.

Background
A native of Dongluzhou (東潞州; believed to be present-day Changzhi, Shanxi), Liu Tang is muscular and dark-complexioned. He is nicknamed "Red Haired Devil" because his hair is of a crimson hue and his broad face bears a prominent red birthmark. A skilled fighter, he specialises in the use of pudao. With no fixed abode, he mainly does illegal trading in Shandong and Hebei.

Robbing the convoy of birthday gifts
Liu Tang gets wind of the conveyance of valuables to the Grand Tutor Cai Jing in the imperial capital Dongjing from Daming. They are birthday gift from Cai's son-in-law Grand Secretary Liang Shijie, the prefect of Daming. Liu rushes to Dongxi village in Yuncheng County to suggest to Chao Gai, the village's headman who is well-known for chivalry, that they together hijack the valuables. Before he reaches Chao's home, he gets drunk and falls asleep in a rundown temple in the village.

Lei Heng, a chief constable of Yuncheng, comes to the temple that night while on patrol with his men. Lei is certain that Liu, with his odd and vagabond looks, is up to no good in the village. They pounce on him and tie him up before he could resist. They then stop by at Chao Gai's manor for some refreshment. Out of curiosity, Chao secretly goes to check on Liu, who is suspended in a side room. Liu tells Chao the purpose of his visit. Chao Gai then lies to Lei Heng that Liu Tang is his nephew, thus winning his release. However, feeling sore over the arrest, Liu catches up with Lei Heng as he returns to office and challenges him to a fight. Chao Gai comes to the scene and stops the clash.

The hijack team eventually comprises seven men, namely Chai Gai, Wu Yong, Gongsun Sheng, Liu Tang and the three Ruan brothers. Disguised as date traders and with the help of Bai Sheng, who imposes as a wine seller, they trick the escort party led by Yang Zhi to take the drugged wine of Bai. When the escorts fall over numb in their limbs, the seven men cart away the valuables. 

But authorities soon track down essential clues and send soldiers to seize Chao Gai at his house. Song Jiang, a clerk of Yuncheng's magistrate, learns of the arrest order and rushes to alert Chao to flee. After beating their pursuers, Chao leads his gang to join the outlaw stronghold at Liangshan Marsh.

Joining Liangshan
Worried that Chao Gai would usurp his position, Wang Lun, the chief of Liangshan, tries to send the group away with gifts and excuses. Wu Yong instigates Lin Chong, who has been cold-shouldered by Wang since joining the stronghold, to kill the chief. Chao Gai is then elected the new chief of Liangshan, with Liu Tang taking the fifth position. 

Chao Gai sends Liu Tang to take some gold pieces and a letter to Song Jiang to convey his gratitude. Song is shocked when Liu, whose wanted notice bearing his picture is widely posted in the region, greets him openly one night on the street. Besides, Liu could be easily identified by the prominent birthmark on his face. Nevertheless, Song  takes Liu to a quiet inn where he accepts only one piece of gold and the letter. It is this letter which later leads to Song killing his mistress Yan Poxi, who threatens to report his link to the outlaws to the authorities. The incident starts Song on the way to become a bandit.

When the Liangshan outlaws attack Dongchang Prefecture (東昌府; in present-day Liaocheng, Shandong) for food, they come up against the garrison commander Zhang Qing, who flings stones with great accuracy. Zhang fells many Liangshan warriors from horseback with his stones. Liu Tang, seeing that mounted combat is getting nowhere, charges at Zhang on foot. But he is captured when Zhang knocks him down with a stone. He is freed after the outlaws overran Dongchang.

Campaigns and death
Liu Tang is appointed as one of the infantry leaders of Liangshan after the 108 Stars of Destiny came together in what is called the Grand Assembly. He participates in the campaigns against the Liao invaders and rebel forces in Song territory following amnesty from Emperor Huizong for Liangshan.

In the battle of Hangzhou in the campaign against Fang La, Liu Tang meets his end when, eager to score merit, he charges into the city upon noticing the gate is open. A beam is dropped on him when he gets past the gate, crushing him to death. He is later awarded the posthumous title "Martial Gentleman of Loyalty" (忠武郎).

References
 
 
 
 
 
 
 

36 Heavenly Spirits
Fictional characters from Shanxi